Volker Ordowski (born 11 September 1973 in Weilen unter den Rinnen) is a German former professional road bicycle racer, retiring after riding for UCI ProTeam Gerolsteiner for ten seasons.

Major results 

1995
 2nd Overall Bayern Rundfahrt
1997
 5th Overall Tour of Sweden
1st Stage 3
2000
 9th Overall Regio-Tour
2004
 3rd Kuurne–Brussels–Kuurne
2005
 9th Overall Niedersachsen-Rundfahrt
2007
 4th Memorial Rik Van Steenbergen

External links 
 

1973 births
Living people
People from Zollernalbkreis
Sportspeople from Tübingen (region)
German male cyclists
Cyclists from Baden-Württemberg